Lake George  is a community in the Canadian province of Nova Scotia, located in  Kings County.

Lake George is a Provincial Park beach area that is located 16 km south of Berwick opened from mid-May to mid-October.. The main attraction of Lake George is its 4.16 ha (10.28 acre) lake located and 125 North River Road, Lake George. The public freshwater sandy beach is lined with picnic tables, changing areas and parking for the public. The beach is ideal for boating, canoeing, kayaking and swimming. There are also cottages lined up alongside the whole lake which gives it a sense of community.

See also
 Lake George (Kings County, Nova Scotia)
 Royal eponyms in Canada

References

Lake George on Destination Nova Scotia

Communities in Kings County, Nova Scotia